Cost Per Paper (CPP) means the total money spent on one research paper, the money is accounted from the National Natural Science Foundation (NSFC). 
CPP can be used to measure the level of scientific research, which means the bigger CPP value and the better research.

History
The "CPP" conception was raised by Jianguo Gao (高建国) when he analyzed the characteristics of elevated Cost Per Paper of Zhejiang Normal University.

References
高建国. 单篇论文成本和国家自然科学基金资助模式探讨. 中国科技资源导刊, 2012, 44(1): 90-95.

Gao, Jianguo. Analysis of Elevated Cost Per Paper and the Modification of Funding Pattern of National Natural Science Foundation. China Science & Technology Resources Review, 2012, 44(1): 90-95.

External links
http://blog.sciencenet.cn/blog-260340-480471.html

https://web.archive.org/web/20160303222203/http://www.zgkjzydk.com.cn/ch/reader/view_abstract.aspx?file_no=20120116&flag=1

Costs